SMS Gefion ("His Majesty's Ship Gefion") was an unprotected cruiser of the German Kaiserliche Marine (Imperial Navy), the last ship of the type built in Germany. She was laid down in March 1892, launched in March 1893, and completed in June 1895 after lengthy trials and repairs. The cruiser was named after the earlier sail frigate , which had been named for the goddess Gefjon of Norse mythology. Nevertheless, the conflicting requirements necessary for a fleet scout and an overseas cruiser produced an unsuccessful design, and Gefion was rapidly replaced in both roles by the newer  of light cruisers.

Gefion initially served with the main German fleet and frequently escorted Kaiser Wilhelm II's yacht Hohenzollern on trips to other European countries, including a state visit to Russia in 1897. In late 1897, Gefion was reassigned to the East Asia Squadron; she arrived there in May 1898. The ship took part in the Battle of Taku Forts in June 1900 during the Boxer Uprising in China. She returned to Germany in 1901 and was modernized, but she did not return to service after the work was finished in 1904. She was to be mobilized after the outbreak of World War I in August 1914, but a crew could not be assembled due to shortages of personnel. Instead, she was used as a barracks ship in Danzig from 1916 to the end of the war. In 1920, she was sold, converted into a freighter, and renamed Adolf Sommerfeld. She served in this capacity for only three years, and was broken up for scrap in Danzig in 1923.

Design
Gefion was designed to serve as a colonial cruiser in the German colonial empire; during peacetime she was to police German holdings and suppress native unrest, and in times of war she would act as a commerce raider. In addition, the new cruiser design was intended to be capable of serving as a fleet scout. This pair of roles was necessary because the German naval budget was too small to permit development of pure fleet scouts and colonial cruisers. As a result of the competing design requirements—a high top speed necessary for a fleet scout, very long cruising radius for a commerce raider, and the firepower necessary in the colonies—the resulting design was unsatisfactory.

Gefion, classified as a cruiser-corvette, was authorized in the 1890–91 budget and named for the earlier sail frigate . The contract for her construction was awarded to Schichau-Werke in late 1891.

General characteristics and machinery

The hull was constructed from transverse and longitudinal steel frames, except for the lower stem and stern parts, which were made of bronze.

She was fitted with a fore and main pole mast with spotting tops to aid her gunnery. The ship had a crew of 13 officers and 289 enlisted men. She carried a number of small boats, including one picket boat, one pinnace, two cutters, two yawls, and one dinghy. Gefion was crank, rolled badly, and made severe leeway, and her decks were wet in a head sea. She nevertheless maneuvered well and had a tight turning radius. Steering was controlled by a single rudder.

Steam was provided by six coal-fired, transverse, cylindrical, double water-tube boilers, which were trunked into three vertical funnels.

Armament and armor
Gefion was originally to be armed with  guns, but the main battery was revised to fifteen  SK L/35 guns and finally to ten 10.5 cm guns. She was also equipped with six  SK L/40 guns, with 1,500 rounds. The ship was also fitted with two  deck-mounted torpedo tubes with a total of five torpedoes. The ship was protected with a light armored deck consisting of steel.

Service history

The keel for the new cruiser was laid down on 28 March 1892 at the Schichau-Werke shipyard in Danzig, and the completed hull was launched on 31 March 1893. Kaiser Wilhelm II attended her launching, and the speech was given by the director of the Kaiserliche Werft (Imperial Shipyard) in Danzig, Kapitän zur See (Captain at Sea) Graf Kurt von Haugwitz. Sea trials began on 27 June 1894 at Kiel and lasted until 2 October. Serious defects in her design, in particular poor ventilation, were revealed through the trials, which necessitated modifications at the Kaiserliche Werft in Kiel. She was accordingly placed in reserve after completing her trials. The work lasted until mid-1895, and the ship was ready for commissioning on 5 June 1895. That month, she was present for the celebration marking the opening of the Kaiser Wilhelm Canal.

In July, she escorted Wilhelm II's yacht Hohenzollern on a visit to the king of Sweden and a trip to the Cowes Regatta. The two ships thereafter visited Leith in the Firth of Forth. Following her return to Wilhelmshaven on 17 August, she participated in the annual autumn fleet maneuvers. During the maneuvers, Gefion, a pair of torpedo boats, and a salvage ship searched for the wrecked torpedo boat  in Jammer Bay on 28 August. A second attempt was made on 24 September, but it too was unsuccessful. She thereafter resumed her duties as escort for Hohenzollern, and during this period she conducted further sea trials that confirmed her cruising radius, which was the highest of all German ships at the time.

In February 1896, she was assigned as the watch ship in Kiel. From 24 to 30 May, she joined maneuvers in the Baltic Sea with the II Division of the I Squadron; these were the four s. Gefion rejoined Hohenzollern as her escort for Wilhelm II's voyage to Norway in July. While there, on 10 July, Gefion helped pull free the stranded French steamer . From 9 August to 15 September, Gefion participated in the annual autumn fleet maneuvers in the Baltic and North Seas. By 17 September, she was back in Kiel to resume her duties as watch ship. From 2 to 14 December, she accompanied the II Division through the Kattegat and Skagerrak. She returned to Kiel in early 1897 and continued her watch ship duties until June. She took Admiral Hans von Koester on a trip to Sassnitz in April for celebrations to mark the opening of the first telegraph cable between Germany and Sweden. In June she began to serve as a training ship for stokers. During this period, she escorted Hohenzollern to a sailing regatta in the mouth of the Elbe, which was followed by another trip to Norway and Sweden in July.

On 30 July, Gefion was back in Kiel, though she escorted Hohenzollern to Kronstadt from 4 to 13 August for Wilhelm II to have a meeting with Czar Nicholas II of Russia, along with the I and II Divisions of the Heimatflotte (Home Fleet). Gefion thereafter joined the autumn maneuvers, which lasted until 22 September. She then returned to Kiel for periodic repairs. After this work was completed in December, Gefion was assigned to the newly formed II Division of the East Asia Squadron. The Division was commanded by Prince Heinrich, the brother of Wilhelm II, who flew his flag in the re-built armored cruiser . The protected cruiser Kaiserin Augusta was the third ship in the division. On 15 December, the three ships left Germany, Wilhelm II having instructed their crews, "Should anyone seek to hinder you in the proper exercise of our legitimate rights, go for them with a mailed fist." The division was bound for the newly conquered base at Tsingtau in the Kiautschou Bay concession. They arrived on 5 May 1898 and met the rest of the squadron, which was commanded by Vizeadmiral (Vice Admiral) Otto von Diederichs.

Deployment to the China Station

Shortly before the arrival of the II Division, the United States Navy destroyed the Spanish fleet at the Battle of Manila Bay during the Spanish–American War. Diederichs detached Gefion to investigate the situation in Manila in an attempt to maneuver Germany into a position to secure colonial possessions in the Philippines, or even to obtain a German prince on the Philippine throne outright. In late March 1899, Gefion was sent to Kiaotschou in response to mistreatment of German missionaries there; Kapitänleutnant (Captain Lieutenant) Franz Grapow went ashore with a landing party of 132 marines and artillerymen to punish the offenders.

In April, Prince Heinrich replaced Diederichs as the squadron commander. That same month, Gefion had to leave the harbor at Wusong to assist Deutschland, which had suffered engine damage. At the end of the month, Gefion steamed up the Yangtze River as far as Hankou. She visited Japanese ports, including Nagasaki, starting in June and the Russian port of Vladivostok in August, before having to assist Deutschland once again, after the latter vessel struck a reef in Samsah Bay in Fujian. As a precautionary measure, she escorted Deutschland to Hong Kong for repairs. At the end of the year, Gefion met Deutschland in Bangkok; the latter vessel was carrying Prince Heinrich back to Germany. In January 1900, Vizeadmiral Felix von Bendemann arrived to take command of the East Asia Squadron, aboard his flagship, the protected cruiser . In the first half of the year, Gefion and the rest of the squadron cruised in the German central Pacific colonies.

By the end of May 1900, the unrest that sparked the Boxer Uprising began to appear in the Shandong Peninsula, particularly around the German base at Tsingtau. After the outbreak of the rebellion, Gefion and the rest of the squadron joined ships from other European navies to launch a relief expedition under the command of Edward Hobart Seymour. The ships bombarded Chinese coastal defenses southeast of Tianjin and sent an expeditionary force—the Seymour Expedition—ashore at the Battle of Taku Forts on 16–17 June. The contingent from Gefion was commanded by Kapitänleutnant Otto Weniger; these men participated in the storming of the Great Hsi-Ku Arsenal in Tianjin. Starting in mid-July, Gefion was stationed outside the mouth of the Yangtze to monitor traffic in the area. In November, she went to Hong Kong for an overhaul. In January 1901, the ship's commander was sent to temporarily govern Tsingtau on behalf of the ill governor. Between February and April, Gefion was in Nagasaki, and in June she was stationed at Shanghai. She stayed there until September, when the Admiralstab (Admiralty Staff) ordered her to return to Germany. On 22 September she departed Chinese waters and arrived back in Germany on 1 October.

Later service

She was decommissioned for a major reconstruction the day she returned to Germany. The work was done at the Kaiserliche Werft in Wilhelmshaven from December 1901 to 1904. New, more powerful electrical generators were installed, the upper deck was enclosed, and the 10.5 cm guns that had been located on the upper deck were moved to gun ports in the hull. The two 5 cm guns that were located abreast of the center funnel were moved further aft, to the third funnel. After completion of the work, Gefion was left out of service in reserve. Following the outbreak of World War I in August 1914, the Admiralstab ordered Gefion to be reactivated, and on 10 August Korvettenkapitän (Corvette Captain) Waldeyer was placed in command of the ship. A crew could not be assembled due to shortages in personnel, however, and so the ship could not be placed back into service. Waldeyer was therefore transferred to another ship on 21 August. Gefion was thereafter moved to Danzig in 1916 for use as a barracks ship for crews of warships being repaired at the Kaiserliche Werft there. She remained there for the duration of the war, and was stricken from the Navy Directory on 5 November 1919.

She was thereafter sold to Norddeutsche Tiefbaugesellschaft, converted into a diesel-powered freighter, and renamed Adolf Sommerfeld in 1920. She had been purchased along with the old pre-dreadnought , from which some material was taken for Gefions conversion. The ship's magazines and most of her machinery spaces were converted into cargo holds. The conversion was not particularly successful, and was only done due to a severe shortage of shipping in the aftermath of the war. As a result, Adolf Sommerfeld served only very briefly, and was broken up for scrap by Danziger Hoch- und Tiefbau in Danzig in 1923.

Notes

Footnotes

Citations

References

Further reading
 

Cruisers of the Imperial German Navy
Ships built in Danzig
1893 ships
World War I cruisers of Germany
Ships built by Schichau